Nicolas Cammaille-Saint-Aubin (25 March 1770, Paris – 26 August 1832, Paris) was a French playwright.

Biography 
Cammaille made his acting debut at the Théâtre de l'Ambigu-Comique in 1792 and the very day after the assassination of Marat, announced in the Journal des spectacles that he had written a comedy in tribute to the Revolutionary leader. That was L'Ami du peuple ou Les intrigants démasqués which met an important success when given at the Ambigu-Comique in 1793. Le Concert de la rue Feydeau ou la Folie du jour witten with René Perin triggered unrest in the political press conducted by Alphonse Martainville.

Director of the Ambigu-Comique in 1797, he became an employee by the Ministry of police after the Coup of 18 Fructidor then became head of the Théâtre de la Cité in 1800 a position he held only a year due to the little success of the plays that were presented at that time.
 
He continued to perform in his own plays then, in 1804, joined the troupe of the Théâtre de la Gaîté before passing in 1806 into that of the Théâtre Molière. In 1808, he was hired by the Théâtre de l'Impératrice but from that date no longer held leading roles. He left the stage as an actor in 1811.

After he entered the General Post Office in 1814, seriously ill, he spent the last year of his life in the Maison royale de santé where he died 26 August 1832 aged 52 ans.

Works 
1793: L'Ami du peuple ou Les intrigants démasqués, three-act comedy, in verse
1794: Le Concert de la rue Feydeau ou la Folie du jour, one-act comedy, in prose, with René Perin
1797: Marguerite, ou Les voleurs, one-act drama, mingled with pantomime, fights, etc., with Louis-François Ribié
1797: Le Moine, five-act comedy mingled withs, dances, pantomime
1797: La Fausse mère ou Une faute de l'amour, five-act drama
1799: Les Chinois ou Amour et nature, three-act dialogued pantomime
1800: L'Élève de la nature, ou le Nouveau peuple, three-act pantomime
1802: Ima, ou les Deux mondes, three-act allegorical melodrama, extravaganza
1803: Louise ou le Théâtre, one-act comedy
1805: La Fille de l'hospice, ou la Nouvelle Antigone, three-act melodrama, extravaganza, from the novel by Ducray-Duminil
1809: Le Prince de la Newa, three-act melodrama
1811: Boutade dialoguée à Napoléon père, sur la naissance du Roi de Rome
1817: Le Passage de la mer Rouge ou La délivrance des Hébreux
undate: A la paix, song

Bibliography 
 Charles Ménétrier, Galerie historique des comédiens de la troupe de Nicolet, 1869, (p. 255–263) 
 Henry Lyonnet, Dictionnaire des comédiens français, 1911
 Pierre Larousse, Grand Larousse encyclopédique, vol.2, 1960, (p. 545)

External links 
Nicolas Cammaille-Saint-Aubin on Data.bnf.fr

18th-century French dramatists and playwrights
19th-century French dramatists and playwrights
1770 births
Writers from Paris
1832 deaths